Jaatishwar [Translation {One who remembers his or her past life}]
 is a 2014 Indian Bengali musical drama film directed by Srijit Mukherji, starring Prosenjit Chatterjee, Jisshu Sengupta and Swastika Mukherjee. The main focus of the plot revolves around the life and notable works of Anthony Firingee (Hensman Anthony), a 19th-century Bengali language folk poet of Portuguese origin, along with other supporting characters. The time frame of the storyline jumps between two different time periods—19th century and the present day (2013). The music of Jaatiswar is composed by Kabir Suman.

The film has been recognized as the most awarded film in the 61st National Film Awards with 4 awards in the following categories -Best Music Direction, Best Male Playback Singer, Best Costume Design and Best Make-up Artist.

Plot
In the present timeline, Rohit Mehta (Jisshu Sengupta), a Gujarati born and brought up in Calcutta, falls in love with Mahamaya (Swastika Mukherjee) and tries to woo her. Since he can just barely utter a few Bengali words (and that too in the wrong places), Mahamaya throws him a hurdle to cross - if he can write a song with correct Bengali lyrics and sing it without any accent or mistake, she would think of a possible relationship. Rohit accepts the challenge and goes to Portugal to study colonial history.

Two years pass. Mahamaya is now a radio jockey at a popular radio station. Rohit is in Portugal but still very much in love with her. His Bengali is being refined by his friend and classmate Bodhi (Abir Chatterjee). Rohit chooses the music course and decides to do a dissertation on the 19th Century folk poet Hensman Anthony(Anthony Firingee). He goes to Calcutta and then to Farashdanga, Chandannagar, where Anthony lived and composed his songs. He goes to the local library to get some books where he meets the assistant librarian, a mysterious man named Kushal Hajra (Prosenjit Chatterjee), who claims to be the re-incarnation of Anthony himself. Kushal laments that the visions of his previous life are haunting him every day, and slowly taking over the memory of his present life. Rohit promises to take him to Calcutta for treatment, in return he demands the life history of Anthony.

The story then goes back to the 19th Century, where Anthony impresses the villagers with his musical talent. He saves a young Bengali widow, Soudamini, from performing sati and later marries her. But he yearns to learn the Bengali language and compose songs in that language. He learns it, reading Hindu scriptures and understanding the meaning of the folk compositions. In those days, kavigaans were very popular in Calcutta, where two kaviyaals or folk poets would face each other with their respective groups and compete with each other through songs and poems. Anthony was impressed by the kavigaans and decided to form a group on his own. He used to compose the songs himself, and on the first occasion met the woman kaviyaal, Joggeshwari (Ananya Chatterjee), whom he defeats. Slowly, as he began to progress in his career as a kaviyaal, he competed with noted kaviyaals of the time like Ram Basu (Sujan Mukherjee) and Thakur Singha (Biswajit Chakraborty).

Simultaneously, in the present timeline, Kushal is taken to a psychiatrist, where he is informed that to stop the visions, he must complete a work which he could not possibly do as Anthony. Kushal's visions get stronger and stronger. Rohit meanwhile has found a way to sing his latest Bengali composition in front of Mahamaya, whose radio company has decided to organize a competition among bands hailing both from West Bengal and Bangladesh, "Bandemonium". Bodhi, who meanwhile had come to Calcutta to meet Rohit, takes him to Sidhu (playing himself) to arrange musicians for Rohit's performance. Meanwhile, Mahamaya had also started developing feelings for Rohit.

Kushal reveals to Rohit the story of Anthony's last kavigaan. Anthony had been planning to do a Durga-puja all by himself. But the villagers were against this, as, to them, Anthony is a firingee (foreigner) who had no right to perform a Hindu puja. He tells Soudamini that he is going to Calcutta for another kavigaan, and so won't be staying during the days of the puja. As planned, he leaves for Calcutta on the day of the puja. This time, his competition is with the best kaviyaal, Bhola Moira (Kharaj Mukherjee). The competition heightens and Anthony wins after a tough fight.

In the present timeline, the day of "Bandemonium" has arrived. Rohit goes on stage and performs his Bengali song E Tumi Kemon Tumi as Mahamaya looks on, tears in her eyes. Within the song, the film goes back to the 19th Century. After Anthony returned from Calcutta, victorious against Bhola Moira, he finds his house and his durga idol set on fire by the villagers. He finds Soudamini dead and nobody around. With his love killed and his faith shattered, he digs a grave for her, and then for himself (as he had once promised jokingly to his wife).

During the show, Bodhi brings Kushal to the auditorium to see the performance of Rohit. Kushal meets Mahamaya, and then leaves abruptly. After the performance, Rohit and Mahamaya profess their love for each other backstage. Rohit suddenly is informed that Kushal is missing. He, along with Mahamaya, goes to Kushal's house in Chandannagar, where they find him completely insane and lost in his visions. He attacks Rohit and then blabbers rubbish. Rohit, heartbroken, leaves with Mahamaya, realising that Kushal is beyond cure now. The film then ends with a final twist, revealing Mahamaya as the reincarnation of Soudamini, though she remembers nothing of her previous birth. Anthony had wanted to apologize to his wife for leaving her alone to get killed by the neighbours, which Kushal does after Mahamaya leaves with Rohit. The visions will not haunt him anymore. The film ends as Kabir Suman's song "Jaatishwar" plays in the background.

Cast

 Prosenjit Chatterjee as Kushal Hajra / Hensman Anthony aka Anthony Firingee
  Srikanto Acharya as the Voice of  Anthony Firingee
 Jisshu Sengupta as Rohit Mehta
 Swastika Mukherjee as Mahamaya Bandyopadhyay aka Maya / Soudamini, wife of Hensman Anthony
 Abir Chatterjee as Bodhi ( Guest Appearance)
 Rahul Banerjee as Amitava (Guest Appearance)
 Riya Sen as Sudeshna (Guest Appearance)
 Mamata Shankar as Mahamaya's mother (Guest Appearance)
 Ananya Chatterjee as Joggeshwari (Special Appearance)
 Sumit Samaddar as Gourhari, an angry villager
 Dwijen Bandopadhyay as the village priest
 Kharaj Mukherjee as Bhola Moira
 Tamal Roychowdhury as Horu Thakur
 Kalikaprasad Bhattacharya as Lalon (unnamed in the film)
 Biswajit Chakraborty as Thakur Singha
 Neel Mukherjee as Ram Basu
 Srijit Mukherji as Bikram Botobyal aka Vicky, Mahamaya's boss
 Dr. Kaushik Ghosh as Dr. Sengupta
 Bharat Kaul as Rohit's father
 Chaitali Dasgupta as Rohit's mother
 Sumant M Sarkar as Librarian
 Kabir Suman as himself
 Anindya Chatterjee as himself
 Rupam Islam as himself
 Siddhartha Roy (Sidhu) as himself
 Anupam Roy as himself

Soundtrack
Kabir Suman is the music director of the film, while Indradip Dasgupta is the assistant music director. The album was critically and commercially successful. All the kabigaans of the film is included in the album. The kabigaans bring back a long lost era of Bengali music through this film. Curiously, the song Jaatishwar which is taken from Kabir Suman's own album Jaatishwar(1997), is not included in the soundtrack, but is used during the end credits of the film, probably to emphasize on the protagonist's state of mind.

Track list

Reception
The film was released on 17 January 2014 in India and received positive critical reviews. It is hailed as one of the best works of Srijit Mukherji and Prosenjit Chatterjee. The film had a special screening for the President of India Pranab Mukherjee on 15 January 2014 in Rashtrapati Bhavan in New Delhi. The film was among a shortlist of eight films from India in the race for submission to the 87th Academy Awards for Best Foreign Language Film.

Awards

References

External links

Bengali-language Indian films
2010s Bengali-language films
2014 films
Films set in Kolkata
Films set in West Bengal
Films that won the Best Costume Design National Film Award
Films that won the National Film Award for Best Make-up
Films directed by Srijit Mukherji
Reliance Entertainment films